Ezekiel 20 is the twentieth chapter of the Book of Ezekiel in the Hebrew Bible or the Old Testament of the Christian Bible. This book contains the prophecies attributed to the prophet/priest Ezekiel, and is one of the Books of the Prophets. In chapters 20 to 24 there are "further predictions regarding the fall of Jerusalem". In this chapter, Ezekiel speaks on God's behalf to some of the elders of Israel.

Text
The original text of this chapter is written in the Hebrew language. This chapter is divided into 49 verses.

Textual witnesses
Some early manuscripts containing the text of this chapter in Hebrew are of the Masoretic Text tradition, which includes the Codex Cairensis (895), the Petersburg Codex of the Prophets (916), Aleppo Codex (10th century), Codex Leningradensis (1008).

There is also a translation into Koine Greek known as the Septuagint, made in the last few centuries BC. Extant ancient manuscripts of the Septuagint version include Codex Vaticanus (B; B; 4th century), Codex Alexandrinus (A; A; 5th century) and Codex Marchalianus (Q; Q; 6th century).

Verse 1
  It came to pass in the seventh year, in the fifth month, on the tenth day of the month,
 that certain of the elders of Israel came to inquire of the Lord, and sat before me. (NKJV)
The opening of chapter 8 has similar wording. The recorded date of the occurrence in chapter 20 would fall in July–August 591 BC, calculated to be August 14, 591 BCE, based on an analysis by German theologian Bernhard Lang.

Verse 4
 Will you judge them, son of man, will you judge them?
 Then make known to them the abominations of their fathers. (NKJV)
 "Son of man" (Hebrew: בן־אדם -): this phrase is used 93 times to address Ezekiel.
 "Abomination" (Hebrew plural: תּוֹעֲבֹ֥ת tō-‘ă-ḇōṯ; singular: תּוֹעֵבָה ): something loathsome or objectionable, especially for "Jehovah", "specially used for things belonging to the worship of idols" or idolatrous practices and objects.

Verse 5
“Say to them, ‘Thus says the Lord God: “On the day when I chose Israel and raised My hand in an oath to the descendants of the house of Jacob, and made Myself known to them in the land of Egypt, I raised My hand in an oath to them, saying, ‘I am the Lord your God.’"
The text in the King James Version makes no reference to God's oath in this verse.

Verse 29
Then I said to them, "What is this high place to which you go?" So its name is called Bamah to this day.
"Bamah" means "high place". Theologian Andrew B. Davidson suggests that Ezekiel uses "a punning and contemptuous derivation of the word", using what (mah) and go (ba):
What (mah) is the high place whereunto ye go (ba)?" 
Whilst he disagrees with the interpretation, Davidson notes that "some have supposed that “go” has the sense of “go in” (e.g. : Judah saw there a daughter of a certain Canaanite ... and he married her and went in to her) and that the allusion is to the immoralities practised on the high places".

Verse 35
And I will bring you into the wilderness of the peoples, and there I will plead My case with you face to face.
The "wilderness of the peoples" is alternatively translated as "the wilderness of the nations" (NIV), or "a desert surrounded by nations" (Contemporary English Version). Davidson suggests it refers to "the Syro-Babylonian wilderness, adjoining the peoples among whom they were dispersed", perhaps the modern-day Syrian Desert. Davidson suggests that Ezekiel may have followed Hosea's words here:
Therefore, behold, I will allure her,Bring her into the wildernessAnd speak kindly to her.Verse 37
 “I will make you pass under the rod, and I will bring you into the bond of the covenant; (NKJV)
 "Bond" (Hebrew: מסרת )'': "band" or "terms" in New Living Translation; contraction of מַאֲסֹרֶת, used in relation to the "covenant", the same root as the word "mesorah".

See also

 Av: Fifth month in Hebrew calendar
 Exodus
 Egypt
 Israel
 Jacob
 Sabbath
 Ten Commandments
 Tisha B'Av
Related Bible parts: Exodus 20, Deuteronomy 5, Romans 6, Galatians 5

Notes

References

Bibliography

External links

Jewish
Ezekiel 20 Hebrew with Parallel English
Ezekiel 20 Hebrew with Rashi's Commentary

Christian
Ezekiel 20 English Translation with Parallel Latin Vulgate

20